Maximization or maximisation may refer to:
 Maximization in the sense of exaggeration
 Entropy maximization
 Maximization (economics)
 Profit maximization
 Utility maximization problem
 Budget-maximizing model
 Shareholder value, maximization
 Maximization (psychology)
 Optimization (mathematics)
 Expectation–maximization algorithm

See also
 Minimization (disambiguation)